Great Falls is a waterfall formed along the Housatonic River at Falls Village in the town of Canaan amidst Connecticut's Litchfield Hills.  Great Falls is the highest volume waterfall in the state, though a great deal of its potential water volume is diverted immediately upstream during most of the year for hydro-electric power generation.

References

Waterfalls of Connecticut
Landforms of Litchfield County, Connecticut